Riste Naumov (born 14 April 1981) is a retired Macedonian football forward.

Club career
Following his transfer from AC Omonia in January 2008 to Ethnikos Achnas, Naumov was a prolific goal-scorer, scoring 12 goals in 16 appearances and was therefore the leading scorer in the second round of the Cypriot first division. At FK Viktoria Žižkov, who were at that time in the Czech First League, he played regularly and was their top scorer in a season (2008–9) which saw them relegated. His move to SK Slavia Prague came as a result. However at Slavia he only managed 14 appearances, several as substitute, in two seasons and was released at the end of the 2010–11 season.

He retired at the end of the 2020/21 season at Bregalnica Štip after winning promotion with his boyhood club.

International career
He made his senior debut for Macedonia in a November 2005 friendly match against Iran and his second and final international was two days later against Paraguay.

References

External links

 Profile at Macedonian Football 

1981 births
Living people
Sportspeople from Štip
Association football forwards
Macedonian footballers
North Macedonia youth international footballers
North Macedonia under-21 international footballers
North Macedonia international footballers
FK Bregalnica Štip players
FK Cementarnica 55 players
FK Vardar players
AC Omonia players
Ethnikos Achna FC players
FK Viktoria Žižkov players
SK Slavia Prague players
FC Spartak Trnava players
Zwegabin United F.C. players
Ayeyawady United F.C. players
Macedonian First Football League players
Cypriot First Division players
Czech First League players
Myanmar National League players
Macedonian Second Football League players
Macedonian expatriate footballers
Expatriate footballers in Cyprus
Macedonian expatriate sportspeople in Cyprus
Expatriate footballers in the Czech Republic
Macedonian expatriate sportspeople in the Czech Republic
Expatriate footballers in Slovakia
Macedonian expatriate sportspeople in Slovakia
Expatriate footballers in Myanmar
Macedonian expatriate sportspeople in Myanmar
Expatriate footballers in the Maldives
Macedonian expatriate sportspeople in the Maldives
Club Eagles players